William Keys may refer to:
 William Keys (Australian Army officer)
 William M. Keys, United States Marine Corps general
 Bill Keys (trade unionist)
 Billy Keys, American basketball player and coach